Los del Río ("Those from the River"), also known as The Del Rios, are a Spanish Latin pop and dance duo which was formed in 1962 by Antonio Romero Monge (17 February 1948) and Rafael Ruiz Perdigones (10 November 1947). They are best known for their hit dance single "Macarena", originally released in 1993. The song went on to become a worldwide success.

Career
The single "Tengo, tengo" was released on February 18, 1996, and appeared later that year on the album Fiesta Macarena. The group ultimately released six albums: A mí me gusta, Macarena Non Stop, Fiesta Macarena, Colores, Rio y Guestano and Alegria y cosabuena. Five of the albums featured versions of "Macarena", in different styles and remixes.

Because of their considerable success worldwide, their native town of Dos Hermanas has named a new municipal music hall, the Anfiteatro Los del Río, after them.

Another well-known song by Los del Río is "Sevilla tiene un color especial," which is featured prominently in the Spanish movie Ocho apellidos vascos.

Awards and nominations
{| class="wikitable sortable plainrowheaders" 
|-
! scope="col" | Award
! scope="col" | Year
! scope="col" | Nominee(s)
! scope="col" | Category
! scope="col" | Result
! scope="col" class="unsortable"| 
|-
!scope="row" rowspan=2|World Music Awards
| rowspan=2|1997
| rowspan=2|Themselves
| World's Best Selling Spanish Group
| 
| rowspan=2|
|-
| World's Best Selling Latin Group
|

Discography

Albums

Singles

References

External links

IMC Records Announces the Signing of 'Los del Rio'
Los del Rio are celebrating a Fiesta Quinceañera

 

Musicians from Andalusia
Spanish musical duos
Musical groups established in 1962
Latin pop music groups
Latin Grammy Lifetime Achievement Award winners
Pop music duos
1962 establishments in Spain